Deimos is a fictional character appearing in DC Comics publications and related media, commonly as a recurring adversary for the superhero Warlord. He is a wicked sorcerer created by Mike Grell debuting in 1st Issue Special #8 (November 1975), and is a distinct character from the Olympian god of the same name, a different DC Comics character who is an enemy of Wonder Woman.

Fictional character biography
Initially Deimos used advanced New Atlantean science to achieve his ends, later he became an adept of black magic. Deimos was a high priest of the kingdom of Thera who used knowledge hidden in the legendary Scrolls of Blood to ascend to the throne of that city-state. Not content with a single city-state, he plotted to conquer all of Skartaris only to be foiled by Travis Morgan—now known as the Warlord.

Mask of Life
Deimos was killed by Morgan after kidnapping the hero's paramour, Tara. However, he was soon resurrected by one of his lackeys using the Mask of Life. Deimos initially pretended to be a sorcerer, but his power actually came from access to New Atlantean technology. After being resurrected by the Mask of Life, Deimos became immortal and could transform himself into a serpent or dragon. He could also summon demons from an unknown dimension to do his bidding. The vengeful Deimos kidnapped and cloned Morgan's son Joshua to do battle with his father. Morgan slew both the Joshua clone and Deimos.

Evil One
Deimos was resurrected several more times before striking a bargain with the Evil One. The Evil One brought the would-be conqueror to life a final time, but stripped him of his powers. Eventually, Morgan and Deimos entered combat for the last time, and Deimos was killed and his head thrown to a wolf pack.

Convergence
In the 2015 crossover story Convergence, the heroes of various key cities from Earth's multiverse and throughout history are transported to the planet Telos by a godlike incarnation of Brainiac and forced to engage in deadly combat. The heroes of Earth-2 soon encounter the hidden city of Skartaris underneath, and make an alliance with Deimos to overthrow Brainiac's envoy, a being named Telos, but are later betrayed when Deimos reveals he has captured the various time travellers of the Multiverse and uses their power to defeat Brainiac and instigate a crisis that will remould the multiverse in his image. He is challenged by heroes from all worlds and nearly defeats them all, but is killed the cosmic power of Parallax-era Hal Jordan. The release of chronal energies threatens to destroy the entire Multiverse, with no ensuing reboot. Ultimately a new Waverider is able to summon Brainiac back, who helps Parallax and the pre-2011 incarnation of Superman to travel back in time to DC's original large-scale reboot crossover, Crisis on Infinite Earths, and alter its outcome, thus recreating an infinitely varied Multiverse.

Powers and abilities
Deimos had no inherent powers, but relied on New Atlantean technology at his disposal, pretending to be a sorcerer while using it. When he died and was brought back to life by the Mask of Life, he became immortal, could transform into a dragon or serpent, and summon demons. The Evil One has taken these abilities away from him when he resurrected him.

In other media

Television
 Deimos appeared in an episode of Justice League Unlimited entitled "Chaos at the Earth's Core", voiced by Douglas Dunning. He is seen trying to conquer Skartaris. During his campaign, he was supplied futuristic weapons by Secret Society members Metallo and Silver Banshee in exchange for a huge Kryptonite rock. During a battle with Warlord, he met his apparent demise when he plummeted down a ledge.

Toys
 In 1982, several of the characters from the "Warlord" series received action figures in a line called "Lost World of the Warlord" from Remco. Deimos was one of the figures (along with Warlord, Machiste, Rostov, and Hercules).
 In 2011, Deimos received an action figure in Mattel's Justice League Unlimited line, in a multi-pack alongside Warlord and Supergirl.

References

External links
 DCU Guide: Deimos
 DCU Guide: Deimos chronology
 Fanzing #0: Welcome to the Lost World, a summary of the series.
 Fanzing #0: Warlord Reading Guide

Characters created by Mike Grell
DC Comics supervillains
DC Comics characters who use magic
Comics characters introduced in 1976